Ruth Witt-Diamant was a professor at San Francisco State University from 1931.  She founded and was the first director of the SFSU Poetry Center in 1954.  In her later years, after she retired at age 65, she traveled and taught English poetry at Tokyo University in Japan, becoming a good friend of the Tokugawa family and especially Mrs. Tokugawa. She met Mrs. Tokugawa at a party she attended at the English Embassy in Tokyo, with her friends in the diplomatic service, the McAlpines. She also went on a pilgrimage to Mt. Fuji with Mrs. Tokugawa and her poems, written at the nightly stops, are now held by her son, Stephen Witt Diamant.

She hosted many famous poets in her guest room when she owned the house at 1520 Willard Street. Among the writers who slept here were Anaïs Nin, W. H. Auden, Elizabeth Bishop, James Broughton, Robert Lowell, Stephen Spender and Theodore Roethke, but probably the most famous was Dylan Thomas, a good and close friend of hers, who wrote some rather droll poems about the beer that "magically appeared" in Ruth's icebox.

The Ruth Witt-Diamant Poetry Prize is awarded in her name by San Francisco State University Poetry Center.

Notes and references

External links
San Francisco State University Poetry Center
Photograph of Witt-Diamant, Charles Olson, Robert Duncan, 1957 on the SFSU campus

Academic staff of Tokyo University of Foreign Studies
San Francisco State University faculty
Year of birth missing
Year of death missing